The City University of Applied Sciences (German: Hochschule Bremen) is a public Fachhochschule, a University of Applied Sciences, located in Bremen, Germany. In 1982, this University evolved from the fusion of four Universities of Applied Sciences: the Universities for technology, business, social pedagogy and social economy, and nautics.

The history of the City University of Applied Sciences traces back to the foundation of the Technikum, a School for Civil Engineering and Shipping in 1894 and the foundation of the Social Women's' School, the first School of Social Work in Bremen in 1918.

Hochschule Bremen is a member of the UAS7 (Seven Universities of Applied Sciences) network that forms a strategic alliance of seven leading German Universities of Applied Sciences in teaching and research.

Campuses
The University of Applied Sciences is located at four sites. The central site, where the head office and the Faculties 2 to 5 are arranged, is located in Bremen Neustadt in the street Neustadtswall. The Faculty 1 and the School of International Business can be found at the site Werderstraße. A further site is located near the Bremen Airport where the Center of Computer Science and Media Studies as well as the Institute of Aerospace Technology are arranged. The International Graduate School is situated at the Süderstraße site.

Study
Around 8.800 students of 69 degree courses (thereof 43 Bachelor-/26 Master's degree courses) in five faculties are matriculated at the Bremen University of Applied Sciences in the academic year 2018/18. More than 40 degree courses consist of an obligatory stay abroad being composed of a study and internship abroad. Further attributes of these international degree courses are the language courses of a foreign language as well as the multilingualism of many other courses and also the cooperation with around 300 foreign universities in 2008.

Being practically oriented is another characteristic of all degree courses of the University of Applied Sciences which is reflected in the obligatory internship phases. Further more the students are included in many research projects. In 2004, the University of Applied Sciences founded the International Graduate Center (IGC) for being able to provide extra-occupational and full-time post-graduate degrees. The master's degrees are offered predominantly in the domain Management which will end in the degree Master of Arts (M.A.) or Master of Business Administration (MBA).

International Days
Once a year the International Days take place at the Hochschule Bremen. This event takes two days and is organized by students of the 7th semester of the School of International Business, together with exchange students.

The students portray their impressions and experiences which they have made during their stay abroad in the 5th and 6th semester. This is made through information stands, presentations, pictures and culinary specialities. Besides the students are in attendance to answer questions which may be asked by other students or other interested parties. Also exchange students from African, European and South American countries present their home countries on nicely decorated stands and support the students of the 7th semester.

This event can be seen as a communication platform for the students of lower semesters, who still have to complete their semester abroad, but it is accessible for every interested person, too. The International Days are a good opportunity to get important and interesting information that may help them to take their decision for the destination of their semester abroad. Additionally it is a possibility to collect contacts e.g. for house hunting and internships.
Also presentations about financing possibilities as well as about the different education systems in foreign countries are given by external companies and organisations.

Entry requirements
The general entry requirements are the advanced technical college entrance qualification or the A-levels. Further more there are specific requirements in each degree course like internships, language skills, apprenticeship etc.. Normally the entry of a master's degree course requires a successfully obtained bachelor's degree. Beyond that Bremen offers two further entry possibilities:
The extra accreditation which requires: A main residence in Bremen and surrounding rural districts for at least 1 year, A completed apprenticeship and An examination with a degree as Master, technician or Master of Business Administration etc.
 The classification test which requires: A main residence in Bremen and surrounding rural districts for at least 1 year, An apprenticeship for at least 2 years, an alternative would be the job as skilled labor for at least 5 years, Job-related experiences for at least 3 years in one of the domains of the aimed study, Participation in further and professional training.

Faculties
Five faculties cover 69 degree courses, thereof 43 Bachelor's degree courses and 26 Master's degree courses.

Faculty 1: School of International Business (SIB) 
Since the 1st of March, 2008 the Faculty 1 forms the School of International Business (SIB), which is a union of the international economic degree courses in the Faculty 1. The SIB offers eleven bachelor's degree courses, one Diploma degree course and ten master's degree courses. The Faculty 1 is split up in three areas for which, in each case, a dean coordinates the lectures, together with the particular head of the degree course. All degree courses of the SIB are aimed internationally and each student will complete their 5th or 6th semester at one of 60 affiliate universities of the School of International Business.

Center of International Relations and Practice contacts 
The center of international relations and practise contacts is an independent service institution of the Faculty 1 - School of International Business - for students of the University of Applied Sciences Bremen as well as for exchange students. The main topic is the support of the internationalisation and practice orientation through cooperations and network building with international partner universities, enterprises and institutions.

Faculty 2: Architecture, Civil and Environmental Engineering

Faculty 3: Social Sciences 
The Faculty of Social Sciences focusses on study programs in the areas of social work, health, leisure studies and political sciences. Currently, it offers four Bachelor programs, two Dual Bachelor programs and two Master programs. Four of the programs include an obligatory international semester abroad. The other four take a focus on internationalisation at home and have included elements of internationalisation in the curriculum.

In 2019, the School of Social Work could celebrate its 100th anniversary. In the same year, a masters program Practice Research and Innovation in Social Work could be established.

Faculty 4: Electrical Engineering

Faculty 5: Nature and Engineering

See also

 List of colleges and universities
 Bremen (state)

References

Sources
 Hochschule Bremen, Studienführer- Studienjahr 2008/2009, 29. Aufl., Verlag E. Knoblauch

External links 
 University of Applied Sciences Bremen Website 

Education in Bremen
Universities of Applied Sciences in Germany
Public universities and colleges in Germany
1982 establishments in West Germany
Educational institutions established in 1982